MotoGP: Ultimate Racing Technology 3 is a motorcycle video game released in 2005. It is similar to MotoGP 2 but represents the 2004 Grand Prix motorcycle racing season. The game also features an Extreme Mode which is completely different from MotoGP class Counterparts featuring fictional road motorcycles and fictional representations of real-life locations & cities of respective MotoGP Circuits(like Autobahn Germany, Tokyo, Copacabana Rio de Janeiro, Barcelona City etc) however the grid slots reduced from 20 to 10 bikes in the race. New Unlocking System has been introduced called Seed system in which, Players have to complete all 100 seeds to fulfill unlockables through championship career mode to be used in every game models other than single race mode where each and everything is unlocked. This game also introduces revamped career mode customization features with variety of liveries, leathers, helmets & decal designs to be applied on every bike unlike previous 2 installments where each bike had their own liveries.

Reception

The game received "favorable" reviews on both platforms according to the review aggregation website Metacritic.

References

External links

2005 video games
Mobile games
Grand Prix motorcycle racing video games
Racing video games
THQ games
Video games developed in the United Kingdom
Windows games
Xbox games
Grand Prix motorcycle racing